Proterra may refer to:

Proterra (earthen architecture project), a project partner of the UNESCO World Heritage Earthen Architecture Programme
Proterra (Brazil), Brazilian government rural poverty and land redistribution initiative of the 1970s
Proterra, Inc., a company making electric vehicles
Proterra, an album by the band Runrig